This Is the Remix may refer to:

This Is the Remix (Destiny's Child album)
This Is the Remix (Jessica Simpson album)